Frans Francken the Younger (1581 in Antwerp, 1581 – 6 May 1642, in Antwerp) was a Flemish painter who created altarpieces and furniture panels and gained his reputation chiefly through his small and delicate cabinet pictures with historical, mythological or allegorical themes.  He is the best-known and most prolific member of the large Francken family of artists.   Franckenplayed an important role in the development of Flemish art in the first half of the 17th century through his innovations in many genres including genre painting and his introduction of new subject matter.  He was a frequent collaborator of leading Antwerp painters of his time.

Life
Frans Francken the Younger was born in Antwerp as the son of Frans Francken the Elder and Elisabeth Mertens. His father was a pupil of Antwerp's leading history painter Frans Floris and one of the most important creators of altar pieces of his time in Flanders. Frans Francken the Younger trained with his father Frans the Elder. Frans, together with his brother Hieronymus Francken II, may also have received additional training in the workshop of their uncle Hieronymus Francken I in Paris.   

Frans Francken the Younger likely first worked in the family workshop before he became an independent master in the Antwerp Guild of Saint Luke in 1605. He was deacon of the Guild in 1616. Francken's talent was recognised from an early age. He became a very successful artist and operated a large workshop which made many copies of his original compositions. Already in 1607 he was able to buy a house in the city centre where he established his residence and workshop.

On 8 November 1607 Francken married Elisabeth Plaquet 'with the special permission of the bishop'.  This may have had something to do with the fact that their firstborn son was born before the end of 1607. The son was given the same name as his father and grandfather.  He would be known as Frans III and as an artist he earned himself later the nickname the Rubense Francken (the Rubensian Francken).  Three further boys and five girls were born to the Francken couple.  One of them, Hieronymus, would also become a painter.

Frans Francken the Younger's pupils included Daniel Hagens (1616/17), the Monogrammist N.F., his brother Hieronymus II and his son Frans III.

Work

General

Frans Francken the Younger was a versatile artist who practised in many genres and introduced new subjects into Flemish art.  Many of his works are small historical, allegorical and biblical cabinet paintings with the focus on figures. He also invented or popularized several new themes that became popular in Flemish painting, such as genre scenes populated by monkeys (also referred to as singeries) and Kunstkammer or gallery paintings displaying a wealth of natural and artistic treasures against a neutral wall. Frans Francken the Younger introduced many other unusual themes that later became popular, such as the 'Triumphal Procession of Amphitrite' and 'Croesus and Solon'. Francken also made a series of paintings depicting witches and witchcraft, including portrayals of witches' sabbats.

Frans Francken the Younger signed his works with 'de jonge Frans Francken' ('the young Frans Francken') before the death of his father in 1616.  From the late 1620s he used the signature 'de oude Fr. Francken' ('the old Fr. Francken'), to distinguish himself from his son Frans III. His father had also started signing his paintings with 'den oude Frans Francken' ('the old Frans Francken') after Frans Francken the Younger had become active as an artist.

His paintings are held by most major museums in Europe.

Collaborations
Francken was particularly skilled in painting the human figure, a fact which is confirmed on some of the portraits of the artist that were etched by Anthony van Dyck and carry the Latin inscription: 'ANTVERIÆ PICTOR HVMANARVM FIGVRARVM' (Figure painter of Antwerp). He was frequently invited to contribute figures in compositions by other artists, such as the landscape artists Tobias Verhaecht, Abraham Govaerts and Joos de Momper, the architectural painters Pieter Neeffs the Elder, Pieter Neeffs the Younger, Hendrik van Steenwijk I, Paul Vredeman de Vries and Bartholomeus van Bassen and flower painters such as Jan Brueghel the Elder and Andries Daniels.

Allegorical paintings

A large portion of the output of Frans Francken the Younger consisted of allegorical paintings.  An example is the Allegory on the Abdication of Emperor Charles V in Brussels (Rijksmuseum).  The composition is an allegorical representation of the abdication of Emperor Charles V in Brussels. Charles V who is dividing his empire after a life of continuous warfare and ill health is seated on his throne flanked by his successors Ferdinand I and Philip II. In front of Philip the personifications of the territories of the Empire with their banners are kneeling down. In the foreground the personifications of the continents America, Africa, Europe and Asia are offering gifts.  On the left Neptune is riding his seahorse-drawn triumphal chariot, accompanied by mermen, mermaids and tritons. On the chariot are visible a globe and the two columns with a banderole inscribed with Plus Ultra.

Another allegorical painting is the composition Mankind's Eternal Dilemma: The Choice Between Virtue and Vice (on loan to the Museum of Fine Arts, Boston.  This work is believed to have been painted at the occasion of a wedding and mixes mythological and Christian symbolism.  It represents the eternal choice of mankind between virtue and vice and depicts the three regions of heaven, earth and hell.

Singeries

Frans Francken contributed to the development of the genre of the 'monkey scene', also called 'singerie' (a word, which in French means a 'comical grimace, behaviour or trick'). Comical scenes with monkeys appearing in human attire and a human environment are a pictorial genre that was initiated in Flemish painting in the 16th century and was subsequently further developed in the 17th century.

The Flemish engraver Pieter van der Borcht introduced the singerie as an independent theme around 1575 in a series of prints, which are strongly embedded in the artistic tradition of Pieter Bruegel the Elder.  These prints were widely disseminated and the theme was then picked up by other Flemish artists.  The first one to do so was Frans Francken the Younger who played an important role in the development of the genre.  Other Antwerp artists subsequently contributing to the genre were Jan Brueghel the Elder and the Younger, Sebastiaen Vrancx and Jan van Kessel the Elder. David Teniers the Younger became the principal practitioner of the genre and developed it further with his younger brother Abraham Teniers.  Later in the 17th century Nicolaes van Verendael started to paint these 'monkey scenes' as well.

Gallery paintings

Frans Francken the Younger and Jan Brueghel the Elder were the first artists to create paintings of art and curiosity collections in the 1620s, such as A Cabinet of Curiosities. Gallery paintings depict large rooms in which many paintings and other precious items are displayed in elegant surroundings.  The earliest works in this genre depicted art objects together with other items such as scientific instruments or peculiar natural specimens.  Some gallery paintings include portraits of the owners or collectors of the art objects or artists at work.

The paintings are heavy with symbolism and allegory and are a reflection of the intellectual preoccupations of the age, including the cultivation of personal virtue and the importance of connoisseurship. The genre became immediately quite popular and was followed by other artists such as Jan Brueghel the Younger, Cornelis de Baellieur, Hans Jordaens, David Teniers the Younger, Gillis van Tilborch and Hieronymus Janssens.

Garland paintings
Frans Francken often collaborated with still life specialists such as Andries Daniels, Jan Brueghel the Elder and Younger and Philips de Marlier in the production of garland paintings.  Garland paintings are a special type of still life developed in Antwerp by artists such as Jan Brueghel the Elder, Hendrick van Balen, Andries Daniels, Peter Paul Rubens and Daniel Seghers. They typically show a flower garland around a devotional image or portrait.  This genre was inspired by the cult of veneration and devotion to Mary prevalent at the Habsburg court (then the rulers over the Southern Netherlands) and in Antwerp generally.

Garland paintings were usually collaborations between a still life and a figure painter.  In his collaborations on garland paintings Francken would paint the central figure or representation while the still life painter would create the garland.  Together with Andries Daniels, Frans Francken further developed the genre of garland paintings, creating many special forms, among them garlands around medallions with the decades of the rosary.

Religious works
Later in his life Francken also painted large altarpieces.  In these works he remained immune to the influence of Rubens, who had such a strong appeal on Flemish artists of that time.  His religious works are more indebted to the work of his father.

Among his religiously themed works of particular note are the unusual and stylistically 'reactionary' paintings of biblical scenes, which are framed on all sides by smaller scenes in grisaille.  The grisaille frame echoes the Renaissance ecclesiastical portal.  Each grisaille scene has its own naturalistic perspective and as a result the compositions provide an odd mixture of three-dimensional naturalism and archaic flatness.  Francken used this archaizing technique into the 1620s. This style was possibly invented in the 16th century by the Flemish painter Gillis Mostaert and some works of Mostaert in this style have been erroneously attributed to Frans Francken.

An example of one of these works is The story of the prodigal son (Rijksmuseum, Amsterdam).  The panel shows various scenes from the Parable of the Prodigal Son from the Christian bible. The parable recounts the story of a father with two sons. The younger son asks for his inheritance and after wasting his fortune (the word "prodigal" means "wastefully extravagant"), becomes destitute and has to live in squalor. He returns home with the intention of begging his father to make him one of his hired servants.  His father welcomes him back and celebrates his return but the older son refuses to participate.  In the centre of the composition Francken depicts the scene of the prodigal son during his wild, high-living days in which he squandered his inheritance.  Surrounding this central scene are depicted other scenes of the story in smaller scale and in grisaille.

Family tree

Notes

External links

Flemish Baroque painters
Flemish history painters
Flemish genre painters
Artists from Antwerp
1581 births
1642 deaths
Frans 2